Rajapur was a Lok Sabha parliamentary constituency of Maharashtra. It was abolished in 2008 and merged with some other Vidhan  to form a new Lok Sabha seat territorially, called Ratnagiri-Sindhudurg

Members of Parliament

Election results

1991 Lok Sabha
 Sudhir Sawant (Congress) : 157,135
 Vamanrao Mahadik (Shiv Sena) : 114,089
 Madhu Dandavate (Janata Dal) : Came third.

1996 Lok Sabha
 Suresh Prabhu (Shiv Sena) : 193,566  
 Sudhir Sawant (Congress) : 127,430

2004 Lok Sabha

See also
 Rajapur
 Ratnagiri-Sindhudurg Lok Sabha constituency

Former Lok Sabha constituencies of Maharashtra
Former constituencies of the Lok Sabha
2008 disestablishments in India
Constituencies disestablished in 2008